Mohammad Aftab Alam is a Nepali politician from the Nepali Congress and a suspended member of the House of Representatives of the federal parliament of Nepal. He was a member of the first constituent assembly as well. He is also a former Minister for Labour and Transport Management.

Career
Alam was elected from Rautahat-2 to the Pratinidhi Sabha in the 1999 election and the 2008 Constituent Assembly election but was defeated in the 2013 election from the same constituency.

Alam was elected to parliament in the 2017 legislative election from Rautahat-2 constituency, as a candidate from Nepali Congress. He defeated his nearest rival Kiran Kumar Shah by acquiring 18,833 votes to Shah's 16,865. Following his election to parliament, he was appointed a member of the House Industry, Commerce, Labour and Consumer Interest Committee.

Arrest
Alam was arrested from Rajapur municipality-1, Rautahat, on 13 October 2019 on charges of murder and causing explosion for his alleged involvement in the 9 April 2008 bomb blast in Rautahat and the subsequent murders of the injured. According to a report by The Himalayan Times, it has been alleged that Alam had employed several people, tasked with making bombs to be used for capturing booths in the 2008 constituent assembly elections. When a bomb went off in a massive explosion that injured as many as 18 people, Alam allegedly dumped them at a brick kiln, killing them. República, however, reported that 14 people died in the blast while those and an additional eight injured were dumped in the furnace of the brick kiln murdering the injured and destroying evidence. According to The Kathmandu Post, at least two had died in the initial explosion and as many as two dozen injured were dumped alive into the brick furnace.

He was suspended from his position in the House of Representatives following his arrest.

A single bench of Judge Deepak Dhakal, Rautahat District Court, denied him bail on 15 November 2019, after a preliminary hearing where Alam was allowed to make a statement. Lawyers of Alam had argued that there was no such bomb explosion in Rautahat in 2008, that Alam was completely innocent, and was being framed by the government with a fake list of victims.

References

Living people
Nepali Congress politicians from Madhesh Province
People from Rautahat District
21st-century Nepalese people
Nepal MPs 2017–2022
Nepal MPs 1994–1999
Nepal MPs 1999–2002
Members of the 1st Nepalese Constituent Assembly
1962 births